Theodor Guschlbauer (born 1939 in Vienna) is an Austrian conductor.

Decorations and awards
 1995: Austrian Cross of Honour for Science and Art, 1st class
 1996: Honour "Victoire" for his work on the Opéra du Rhin and at the Strasbourg Philharmonic
 1997: Knight of the Legion of Honour for his musical activities in France 
 Prix d'Honneur at the Fondation Alsace
 Mozart Prize of the Goethe Foundation in Basel
 Grand Prix du Disque for his many recordings in France

References

External links
Biography (scroll down for English)

Guschlbauer, Theodod
Living people
1939 births
Musicians from Vienna
Recipients of the Austrian Cross of Honour for Science and Art, 1st class
Chevaliers of the Légion d'honneur
21st-century Austrian conductors (music)
21st-century male musicians